Murgon Weir is a weir located near Murgon, Queensland, Australia. It was originally constructed only used by nearby farms for agricultural use, though public recreation is also permitted.

The weir is located on Barambah Creek, and is the first artificial walled dam below the Bjelke-Petersen Dam.

Recreation 
The weir is widely unknown to the public because of its unsigned location and small access tracks. Though when found, the weir has opportunities for canoeing, swimming, bushwalking and other water sports.

Kingaroy-Kilkivan Rail Trail
The former bridge crossing of the Kingaroy Branch Railway is located 170 meters from the weir wall. The bridge was removed in early 2015, shortly after the demolition and removal of the railway track. The South Burnett Regional Council is working with Gympie Regional Council with the planning and construction of the Kingaroy-Kilkivan Rail trail between the large town of Kingaroy to Kilkivan via the rail corridor through Murgon. The trail is set to be completed in June 2016.

See also

List of dams and reservoirs in Australia

References

Reservoirs in Queensland
Wide Bay–Burnett
Dams in Queensland
Murgon